Pirnabine (SP-304) is a synthetic cannabinoid receptor ligand, which was developed for the treatment of glaucoma.

References 

Cannabinoids
Benzochromenes
Phenols
Acetate esters